Russell Osborne was an American football coach. He served as the head football coach at Carthage College in Carthage, Illinois for one season, in 1907, compiling a record of 2–5.

Head coaching record

References

Year of birth missing
Year of death missing
Carthage Firebirds football coaches